The Mohican MTB 100 is an ultra-endurance 100 mile (161 km) mountain bike race held annually in early June in North Central Ohio.  The course contains over 11,000 feet of climbing on single-track, double-track and dirt roads.  This course is very scenic, almost entirely tree covered and more than 90% on dirt.
This course is only one lap and is almost entirely in the 5,000 acre (20 km²) Mohican State Park.  This course has been designed in part by a veteran, experienced endurance racer keeping in mind all things loved and dreaded about other courses.  The race has been one of the stops of the National Ultra Endurance Series since 2006. In both the 2006 and 2005 races, problems with course markings were reported by multiple racers.

Results

2006
81 racers started, 61 finished.  Longest finish time was 16½ hours.

2005
31 racers started, 25 finished.

See also
 Wilderness 101 Mountain Bicycle Race
 Lumberjack 100
 Shenandoah 100
 Breckenridge 100

External links
 US National Endurance Mountain Bike series
 Mohican MTB 100 Home Page

Mountain biking events in the United States
Tourist attractions in Ashland County, Ohio
Sports competitions in Ohio
Endurance games
Cycle races in the United States
Recurring sporting events established in 2004
2004 establishments in Ohio